Seaham was a parliamentary constituency of the House of Commons of the Parliament of the United Kingdom that was in existence between 1918 and 1950.  It elected one Member of Parliament (MP) by the first past the post system of election.

History
Seaham was created under the Representation of the People Act 1918 for the 1918 general election, comprising northern parts of the abolished South Eastern Division of Durham. The town of Seaham itself was transferred from Houghton-le-Spring.

It was abolished for the 1950 general election under the Representation of the People Act 1948, with the bulk of the constituency comprising the new constituency of Easington. The expanded Urban District of Seaham Harbour (now incorporating Seaham) was transferred back to Houghton-le-Spring.

Boundaries

 The Urban District of Seaham Harbour; and
 the Rural District of Easington.

Political history 
Incorporating a lot of the mining area of the eastern part of County Durham around Seaham, it had a history of strong Labour Party support.

In the so-called Coupon Election of 1918, Major Evan Hayward was issued a Coalition 'coupon'. Hayward however repudiated the 'coupon' and stood as a Liberal and was elected. The following general election, in 1922, Sidney Webb, an early socialist and author of the Labour Party's then-new constitution, was returned.  Webb was easily re-elected in 1923 and 1924. Sidney Webb was raised to the peerage and his successor in the parliamentary constituency was Ramsay MacDonald, the leader of the Labour Party at the time. At the 1929 general election, MacDonald won and for the second time became Prime Minister over a minority Labour administration.

The economic crisis after 1929 led to a political crisis in mid-1931 and MacDonald failed to secure agreement in cabinet for his proposed cuts in 'outdoor relief' for the unemployed. MacDonald went to see King George V who persuaded him to form a National Government.  In the General Election that followed MacDonald stood in Seaham as National Labour and was comfortably elected and continued to serve as a Prime Minister of a National Government that was predominantly Conservative-supported.

MacDonald retired as Prime Minister in 1935 but remained in the Cabinet. In the general election of 1935 he was resoundingly defeated at Seaham by Emanuel Shinwell, the official candidate of the Labour Party. Shinwell was re-elected in the Labour landslide at the 1945 election and served as MP for the successor constituency of Easington until 1970.

Members of Parliament

Elections

Elections in the 1910s 

Hayward had been issued with the "coalition coupon", but repudiated it.

Elections in the 1920s

Elections in the 1930s 

General Election 1939–40

Another General Election was required to take place before the end of 1940. The political parties had been making preparations for an election to take place and by the Autumn of 1939, the following candidates had been selected; 
Labour: Manny Shinwell
Conservative:

Elections in the 1940s

See also 
History of parliamentary constituencies and boundaries in Durham

References 

Parliamentary constituencies in County Durham (historic)
Constituencies of the Parliament of the United Kingdom established in 1918
Constituencies of the Parliament of the United Kingdom disestablished in 1950
Constituencies of the Parliament of the United Kingdom represented by a sitting Prime Minister